Bârla is a commune in Argeș County, Muntenia, Romania. It is composed of twelve villages: Afrimești, Bădești, Bârla, Brabeți, Ciocești, Malu, Mândra, Mozăcenii-Vale, Podișoru, Șelăreasca, Urlueni and Zuvelcați.

References

Communes in Argeș County
Localities in Muntenia